Wadling is a surname. Notable people with the surname include:

Freddie Wadling (1951–2016), Swedish singer and actor
Len Wadling, Australian rugby league footballer